Wenhaston with Mells Hamlet is a civil parish in the English county of Suffolk. The population at the 2011 Census was 801. It forms part of East Suffolk district and is situated just south of the River Blyth.

References

Civil parishes in Suffolk